The 2022–23 A-League Men, known as the Isuzu UTE A-League for sponsorship reasons, is the 46th season of national level men's soccer in Australia, and the 18th since the establishment of the competition as the A-League in 2004. 

The regular season commenced on 7 October 2022. The season features a mid-season break from 18 November 2022 to 8 December 2022 due to the 2022 FIFA World Cup being held in Qatar.

Melbourne City are the defending premiers and Western United are the defending champions.

Clubs

Stadiums and locations
Twelve clubs are participating in the 2022–23 season.
'' Note: Table lists in alphabetical order.

Personnel and kits

Managerial changes

Foreign players 

The following do not fill a Visa position:
1Those players who were born and started their professional career abroad but have since gained Australian citizenship (or New Zealand citizenship, in the case of Wellington Phoenix);
2Australian citizens (or New Zealand citizens, in the case of Wellington Phoenix) who have chosen to represent another national team;
3Injury replacement players, or National team replacement players;
4Guest players (eligible to play a maximum of fourteen games)

Regular season

League table

Fixtures and results 
The 2022–23 season sees each team play 26 games, starting on 7 October 2022, and concluding on 30 April 2023, with a mid-season break between 14 November 2022 and 8 December 2022, due to the 2022 FIFA World Cup. This will be followed by a finals series for the top six teams.

Melbourne Derby pitch invasion

During the Melbourne Derby between Melbourne City FC and Melbourne Victory FC on 17 December 2022 at the Melbourne Rectangular Stadium, the match was abandoned in the 22nd minute after several incidents of hooliganism took place both on and off the field. Throughout the match, supporters of both teams both ignited and threw flares. 

In the 20th minute, the match was interrupted due to flares being ignited and thrown onto the pitch, two of which had been thrown by Melbourne Victory supporters. Conflict arose when Melbourne City goalkeeper Tom Glover, who was defending the goal in front of the Melbourne Victory supporters end, picked up and threw the flares away from the pitch, the second of which was thrown into the crowd of Victory supporters. This sparked a pitch invasion by between 100–200 spectators, who proceeded to attack Glover and match referee Alex King, both of whom sustained minor injuries. The match was abandoned as a result.

On 23 December, Football Australia handed down interim sanctions on both clubs while a full investigation was being conducted. Both teams had their active supporter bays closed, with Melbourne Victory further sanctioned with supporter restrictions: travelling support was banned for away games, while home games were restricted to only valid club members.

Finals series

Format
The finals series is expected to be held in broadly the same format as the previous year, to be run over three weeks, and involving the top six teams from the regular season. In the first week of fixtures, the third-through-sixth ranked teams will play a single-elimination match, with the two winners of those matches joining the first and second ranked teams in two-legged semi-final ties.  The two winners of those matches meet in the Grand Final.

On 12 December 2022, the APL announced that the 2023 A-League Men Grand Final would be the first of three successive Grand Finals hosted in Sydney, regardless of which two teams earned the right to play in the final. The move received a large amount of backlash from supporters of all 12 clubs.

Elimination-finals

Semi-finals
Summary

|}

Matches

Grand Final

Regular season statistics

Top scorers

Hat-tricks

Notes
(H) – Home team
(A) – Away team

Clean sheets

See also

 2022–23 A-League Women
 2022–23 Adelaide United FC season
 2022–23 Brisbane Roar FC season
 2022–23 Central Coast Mariners FC season
 2022–23 Macarthur FC season
 2022–23 Melbourne City FC season
 2022–23 Melbourne Victory FC season
 2022–23 Newcastle Jets FC season
 2022–23 Perth Glory FC season
 2022–23 Sydney FC season
 2022–23 Wellington Phoenix FC season
 2022–23 Western Sydney Wanderers FC season
 2022–23 Western United FC season

Notes

References

 
1
1
A-League Men seasons
A-League Men